Daly Joseph "Cat" Doucet Sr. (November 8, 1899 – February 9, 1975) was an American politician who served as Sheriff of St. Landry Parish, Louisiana from 1936 to 1940 and 1952 to 1968.

Background
Doucet was born in Grand Prairie, Louisiana.

Doucet was elected sheriff in 1936, served for four more years, and later returned in 1952 for sixteen years, his civil rights endorsement and anti-segregation stance giving Doucet enough African-American support to combat his electoral rivalry.

He was investigated by the FBI for his role in the presence of gambling and prostitution in his local parish, and was once indicted for embezzlement.

Legacy
He had six children with his wife Anna Dorcey.

Doucet died at his daughter's house in New Orleans on February 9, 1975.

He has been described as a colorful figure for his time.

Doucet was inducted into the Louisiana Political Museum and Hall of Fame in 1999.

Bibliography
The Cat and St. Landry (1972) by Mary Alice Fontenot and Vincent Riehl

References

1899 births
1975 deaths
Cajun people
Louisiana Democrats
Louisiana sheriffs
People from Opelousas, Louisiana
20th-century American politicians
People from St. Landry Parish, Louisiana